Christin Albert Piek (born 23 January 1889, date of death unknown) was a Belgian tug of war competitor who competed in the 1920 Summer Olympics. In 1920 he won the bronze medal as a member of the Belgian tug of war team.

References

External links
profile

1889 births
Year of death missing
Olympic tug of war competitors of Belgium
Tug of war competitors at the 1920 Summer Olympics
Olympic bronze medalists for Belgium
Olympic medalists in tug of war
Medalists at the 1920 Summer Olympics